Mehmet Orhan Mersinli (1912 – 17 February 1975 ) was a Turkish civil engineer, civil servant and a government minister,
 
Orhan Mersinli was born in İstanbul in 1912. His father was Cemal Mersinli, an Ottoman pasha who was a member of the Ottoman government. He completed Robert College in İstanbul and the University of Illinois. He was appointed as the  vice director of the General Directorate of Highways (KGM) serving between 1949–1955. He was the general director of KGM between 1956–1958 .

Following the 1960 Turkish coup, on 5 January 1961 he was appointed to the Constituent Assembly of Turkey by the president. During this parliamentary period between 5 January 1961 and 20 November 1961 he was appointed as the Minister of Transport in the 25th government of Turkey. The first Turkish made automobile Devrim was manufactured during his term.

He did not run for the 1961 general elections and  after the elections he became an advisor in a private industrial company.

He was married and father of two. He died on 17 February 1975.

References

1912 births
Engineers from Istanbul
Robert College alumni
Turkish civil engineers
Turkish civil servants
Members of the Constituent Assembly of Turkey
Ministers of Transport and Communications of Turkey
Members of the 25th government of Turkey
1975 deaths